Peter Burke (1811–1881) was an English barrister and serjeant-at-law, known also as a writer.

Life
He was the eldest son of John Burke of Elm Hall, County Tipperary, and brother of Sir John Bernard Burke, born in London on 7 May 1811. He was educated at the college of Caen, Normandy. Having been called to the bar at the Inner Temple in 1839, he joined the northern circuit and the Manchester and Lancashire sessions.

Burke later practised at the parliamentary bar, and appeared before the House of Lords in several major peerage cases. He was made a Queen's Counsel of the county palatine of Lancaster in 1858, and a serjeant-at-law in 1859. He was elected director or chief honorary officer of the Society of Antiquaries of Normandy for 1866-7.

Burke died at his residence in South Kensington, on 26 March 1881.

Works
With some legal works, Burke published:

The Wisdom and Genius of Edmund Burke illustrated in a series of extracts from his writing, with a summary of his life, 1845.
Celebrated Trials connected with the Aristocracy, in the relations of private life, London 1849, 1851.
The Romance of the Forum, or Narratives, Scenes, and Anecdotes from Courts of Justice, 4 vols. London 1852, 1861.
The Public and Domestic Life of the Right Hon. Edmund Burke, London 1853.
Celebrated Naval and Military Trials, London 1866.

Arms

Notes

Attribution

1811 births
1881 deaths
English barristers
Serjeants-at-law (England)
English legal writers
English male non-fiction writers
19th-century English lawyers